Hulsea nana is a North American species of flowering plant in the family Asteraceae known by the common name dwarf alpinegold. It is native to the western United States from Washington, Oregon, and far northern California.

The plant grows in the talus of volcanic mountains and plateaus.

Description
Hulsea nana is a diminutive perennial herb producing clumps of hairy foliage and stout stems rarely more than 20 centimeters (6 inches) tall. The leaves are 2 to 6 centimeters (0.4-2.4 inches) long and have lobed edges and many glandular hairs.

The stem usually bears a single robust flower head with layers of hairy to woolly phyllaries. The center of the head is packed with golden disc florets surrounded by a circumference lined with golden ray florets each about a centimeter (0.4 inches) long.

References

External links
Jepson Manual Treatment, University of California
United States Department of Agriculture Plants Profile
Calphotos Photo gallery, University of California

nana
Flora of California
Plants described in 1858
Flora of Oregon
Flora of Washington (state)
Flora without expected TNC conservation status